"Your Time Hasn't Come Yet, Baby" is a song written by Joel Hirschhorn and Al Kasha and recorded by Elvis Presley for the 1968 motion picture Speedway. It was sung by Presley in the movie and also appeared on its soundtrack album.

The song was originally released on May 21, 1968, as a single (with "Let Yourself Go" on the opposite side) from the upcoming movie due in theaters June 12.

The song peaked at number 72 on the Billboard Hot 100 for the week of July 13.

Recording 
The song was recorded on June 20, 1967, at MGM Studios in Hollywood. Additional vocals were provided by The Jordanaires and Nancy Sinatra.

Track listing

Charts

References

External links 
 
 Your Time Hasn't Come Yet, Baby / Let Yourself Go on the official Elvis Presley website

1968 songs
1968 singles
Elvis Presley songs
Songs written by Joel Hirschhorn
Songs written by Al Kasha